Thomas Raffl (born 19 June 1986) is an Austrian professional ice hockey winger who is currently playing with EC Red Bull Salzburg of the ICE Hockey League (ICEHL). He previously played for Luleå HF of the Swedish Hockey League. He is the older brother of NHL player Michael Raffl. His father Peter Raffl also played ice hockey.

Playing career
Raffl briefly played major junior hockey in Canada with the Kelowna Rockets and Swift Current Broncos of the Western Hockey League during the 2005–06 season.

Since 2007, Raffl has been a fixture participant with the Austrian national team, including at the 2015 IIHF World Championship. In the lead up to the 2015–16 season, Raffl was granted leave by Salzburg on 1 September 2015, to attend the preseason training camp of the NHL's Winnipeg Jets on a professional tryout contract.  Following the training camp, Raffl signed a one-year, one-way contract with the Jets and was assigned to the Manitoba Moose, the Jets' American Hockey League affiliate.

During the 2015–16 season with the Moose, Raffl was unable to maintain his offensive presence, producing just 5 goals in 31 games. Unable to earn a recall to the NHL, at the conclusion of the season, Raffl was not tendered a contract by the Jets and was released to free agency. On 11 July 2016, Raffl returned to Salzburg of the EBEL, signing a one-year deal.

Career statistics

Regular season and playoffs

International

References

External links

1986 births
Austrian ice hockey left wingers
Des Moines Buccaneers players
EC Red Bull Salzburg players
EC VSV players
Ice hockey players at the 2014 Winter Olympics
Kelowna Rockets players
Living people
Luleå HF players
Manitoba Moose players
Olympic ice hockey players of Austria
Sportspeople from Villach
Swift Current Broncos players